Suryabanshi Suraj (born 1995) is an Indian politician who is serving as Member of Odisha Legislative Assembly from Dhamnagar Assembly constituency.

Personal life 
He was born on 18 May 1995. He is the son of Bishnu Sethi.

References 

1995 births
Living people
Odisha MLAs 2019–2024